The 1812 United States presidential election in New Jersey took place between October 30 and December 2, 1812, as part of the 1812 United States presidential election. The state legislature chose eight representatives, or electors to the Electoral College, who voted for President and Vice President.

During this election, New Jersey cast its eight electoral votes to Independent Democratic Republican and Federalist supported candidate DeWitt Clinton.

See also
 United States presidential elections in New Jersey

Notes

References

New Jersey
1812
1812 New Jersey elections